Brakes are an English rock band, formed in 2003 in Brighton. The band consists of vocalist/guitarist Eamon Hamilton, lead guitarist Thomas White, bassist Marc Beatty and drummer Alex White.

They are known as Brakesbrakesbrakes in the United States.

Biography
Brakes formed in 2003, when Thomas White and Alex White of The Electric Soft Parade saw Eamon Hamilton perform a solo gig supporting The Lonesome Organist in Brighton. Marc Beatty of Mockin' Bird Studio and The Tenderfoot (who also worked with British Sea Power, engineering their debut single and recording tracks for their debut album) was also soon recruited, and the band set about recording their debut single, "Pick Up the Phone", which was released on Tugboat Records in 2004. Shortly after forming Brakes, Hamilton was asked by British Sea Power to play keyboards with them, a position he held for three years.

Brakes toured extensively, and in early 2005, recorded their debut album, Give Blood, for Rough Trade Records, at Metropolis Studio, with producer Iain Gore. The album was released in July of the same year. They recorded and mixed the 16-track album in seven days. The album was released by Rough Trade Records to great critical acclaim, achieving five stars from The Observer Music Monthly, Time Out and from many websites, and was voted the best album of 2005 by the influential Rough Trade Shops.

Brakes toured with Belle & Sebastian in January and February 2006, Editors in February/March 2006 and The Killers in November 2006, as well as playing several European and UK headline tours of their own. The touring commitments of Brakes made it impossible for Hamilton to continue playing with British Sea Power, and he amicably left the band in 2006.

Brakes recorded their second album, The Beatific Visions at House of David Studio in Nashville, co-producing the record with Grammy Award-winning producer Stuart Sikes. Whilst recording the album, the band convinced the studio's owner, David Briggs, who had played with Elvis Presley between 1965 and 1977, to play piano on their song "If I Should Die Tonight". It was the first time Briggs had played on an album for three years.

The album was released in the UK in November 2006. BBC Radio 1's Colin Murray hailed it as his album of the year, Rough Trade Shops voted it number four in their Best Albums of 2006, and it received four and five star reviews from many publications and websites. The album was released in the United States in February 2007 by Worlds Fair Records. The band were forced to change their name to "BrakesBrakesBrakes" in the US due to a Philadelphian funk rock band using the name The Brakes. While the album was released under the name BrakesBrakesBrakes in the US, the band will continue to use their original name throughout the rest of the world.

Brakes returned to North America in May and June 2007 for a sold-out headline tour of the US and Canada. Whilst they were on tour, their song "All Night Disco Party" was used in the hit television show Ugly Betty which gained them a wider audience.

Brakes recorded their third studio album, Touchdown, at Chem 19, Hamilton, with Paul Savage (formerly of Glaswegian band The Delgados). It was released by Fat Cat Records on 20 April 2009.

Discography

Albums

Singles

References

External links
 Worlds Fair brakesbrakesbrakes (US label)

Interviews
 Brakes interview on Badvibes.net
 Brakes interview on Twisted Ear
SUPERSWEET interview

Live video
 PUNKCAST#854 live video from Pianos, New York City on 4 October 2005 (RealPlayer), (mp4)
 PUNKCAST#1166 live video from Maxwells, New Jersey on 15 June 2007 (RealPlayer), (mp4)

English indie rock groups
Musical groups from Brighton and Hove
Rough Trade Records artists
Musical groups established in 2003
FatCat Records artists